The Vaigai Reservoir, often known as the Virahanoor Dam, is a small dam on the River Vaigai.  The dam is 10 km from Madurai city, between Madurai and Sivagangai on the Rameshwaram national highway 49.  The dam is commonly referred to as Virahanoor Dam because is sited by the village of Virahanoor.  The dam is under the maintenance of Tamil Nadu Public Works Department (PWD).  A small park is also maintained near the dam.  The main purpose of the dam is to use the water for irrigation purpose for the areas around the dam.

Madurai district
Geography of Madurai
Reservoirs in Tamil Nadu